Goryeong Gaya was one of the lesser chiefdoms of the Gaya confederacy during the Three Kingdoms of Korea.  It was centered in present-day Sangju, North Gyeongsang Province, South Korea.  Legend indicates that it was founded by a King Taejo, to whom a tomb on Obong Mountain in Hamchang-eup, Sangju, is attributed.  

An alliance of marriage was established between Silla and Goryeong Gaya in 522.  For this reason, Goryeong Gaya did not participate in the Baekje-Daegaya offensive against Silla in 538.  However, it does not appear that this alliance was of any lasting benefit to the kingdom.  According to both the Samguk Sagi and the Japanese chronicle Nihon Shoki, Goryeong Gaya fell to Silla in 562. This was the same year that Daegaya was overrun in the south.

The members of today's Hamchang Kim lineage trace their origins to the kings of Goryeong Gaya.

See also
List of monarchs of Korea
History of Korea
Gaya

Gaya confederacy
Gayago
Former countries in Korean history
North Gyeongsang Province